Becco di Mezzodì (2,603m) is a mountain of the Croda da Lago chain, a small mountain group in the central Dolomites. It is located above the resort of Cortina d'Ampezzo in Belluno, northern Italy. The mountain's name means Midday Peak in the local dialect, as the sun appears directly above the peak at midday from Cortina. The climb usually starts from the Refuge Croda da Lago on the road to the Giau Pass. Climbing gear and slings are required.

References 

Mountains of the Alps
Dolomites
Mountains of Veneto
Geography of Cortina d'Ampezzo